This is a short list of some common mathematical shapes and figures and the formulas that describe them.

Two-dimensional shapes 

Sources:

Three-dimensional shapes 

Sources:

Sphere 

The basic quantities describing a sphere (meaning a 2-sphere, a 2-dimensional surface inside 3-dimensional space) will be denoted by the following variables
 is the radius,
 is the circumference (the length of any one of its great circles),
 is the surface area,
 is the volume.

Surface area:

Volume:

Radius:

Circumference:

See also

References 

Mathematics-related lists